Holy Trinity Academy is a mixed secondary school and sixth form located in the Priorslee area of Telford in the English county of Shropshire.

The school was opened in September 2015 in a new campus, replacing Blessed Robert Johnson Catholic College in Wellington. Holy Trinity Academy is a joint Roman Catholic and Church of England school, administered by the Roman Catholic Diocese of Shrewsbury and the Church of England Diocese of Lichfield.

The school has many facilities including 2 football pitches, a netball court, a gym, dance studio and chapel.

A house system is used in the school and consists of 4 teams; Johnson, Liddell, Assisi and Fry.

References

External links
Holy Trinity Academy official website

Secondary schools in Telford and Wrekin
Voluntary aided schools in England
Catholic secondary schools in the Diocese of Shrewsbury
Church of England secondary schools in the Diocese of Lichfield
Educational institutions established in 2015
2015 establishments in England